Okul ("School") is a 2004 Turkish horror-comedy film  directed by the Taylan brothers (Yağmur Taylan and Durul Taylan). It is adapted from the novel Hayalet Kitap by Doğu Yücel who also wrote the screenplay. Kevin Moore provided the film's soundtrack. The film was watched by over three million people.

Plot
The school magazine editor Gökalp is in love with Güldem, a girl in his class. He writes stories and letters to her in order to win her heart, but she isn't interested. So he commits suicide after leaving a secret letter. A year after his death, strange things begin to happen. These are not just experienced only by Güldem, but also by those close to her such as her boyfriend Ersin, her best friends Şebnem and Ceyda, the new school magazine editor Umut and Vedat Bey who spies on the students with cameras. Gökalp's ghost returns for revenge just as the ÖSS exam week is about to begin.

Cast
Nehir Erdoğan (Güldem)
Burak Altay (Gökalp)
Sinem Kobal (Şebnem)
Melisa Sözen (Ceyda)
Berk Hakman (Ersin)
Barış Yıldız (Umut)
Caner Özyurtlu (Ediz)
Serdar Deniz (Giz)
Ahmet Mümtaz Taylan (Vedat Bey)
Deniz Akkaya (Alev)
Emre Kınay (Kemal)
Deniz Güngören (Orçun)

References

External links

2004 films
2000s Turkish-language films
2004 comedy horror films
Films set in Turkey
Turkish comedy horror films
Turkish teen films
2004 comedy films